Paradox Press was a division of DC Comics formed in 1993 after editor Mark Nevelow departed from Piranha Press. Under the initial editorship of Andrew Helfer and Bronwyn Carlton the imprint was renamed. It is best known for graphic novels like A History of Violence and Road to Perdition. Jim Higgins edited the line after Helfer's departure, and Heidi MacDonald briefly took the helm in 2000 at the time of the line's final three Big Books, none of which ever saw publication.

History
Paradox Press was designed to publish graphic novels that were not of the superhero genre (as comprises most of DC's publishing efforts) and were lacking the fantasy and sci-fi elements of DC's "mature reader" line, Vertigo comics.

Due to the limited interest in non-fantasy stories among the graphic novel demographic, the line produced only a handful of books over its decade-long history. While almost all received critical acclaim, none reached high sales amongst the general graphic-novel and comic book reading populace. Two of the imprint's books (A History of Violence and Road to Perdition) were adapted into successful films and Scott McCloud's Understanding Comics (originally published through Kitchen Sink Press) is considered one of the authoritative bibles of the medium. The true-life anthology series of Big Books also found a niche following. The Big Book Of series was an anthology series, each devoted to a theme or concept, e.g., The Big Book of Conspiracies or The Big Book of Urban Legends. 

Due to low sales amongst the line, it was phased out, and most of the books under this imprint are out of print for the foreseeable future. Those books which have remained in print were released under DC's more lucrative Vertigo label.

Books
Below is a list of books published under the Paradox Press logo:

 The Big Book of:
 the '70s
 Bad
 Conspiracies
 Death
 Freaks
 Grimm
 Hoaxes
 Little Criminals
 Losers
 Martyrs
 Scandal!
 Thugs
 the Unexplained
 Urban Legends
 Vice
 the Weird Wild West
 Weirdos
 The Bogie Man
 Brooklyn Dreams
 Family Man

 Gon:
 Gon
 Gon on Safari
 Gon Swimming
 Gon Underground
 Gon Wild!
 Green Candles
 A Gregory Treasury
 A History of Violence
 Hunter's Heart
 La Pacifica
 The Project
 Reinventing Comics
 Road to Perdition:
 Road to Perdition
 Road to Perdition: On the Road
 On the Road to Perdition Book 1: Oasis
 On the Road to Perdition Book 2: Sanctuary
 On the Road to Perdition Book 3: Detour
 Stuck Rubber Baby
 Understanding Comics

In addition, several magazines entitled Weird collected reprint material from the above volumes.

Unpublished work
Slated for 2001 Paradox Press had intentions to release a book known as The Big Book of Wild Women. From time to time mentions of this book can be found on the internet. The book is narrated by "Susie the Floozie". The book was to profile notable women throughout history who had made an impact on our culture while pushing the envelope of unconventional behavior. Among the women to be profiled were risqué nightclub singer-comic Rusty Warren, B-movie goddess Tura Satana, presidential candidate Victoria Woodhull, 19th century sex star Lola Montes, legendary seductress Cleopatra, scandalous writer Anaïs Nin and kinky pin-up icon Bettie Page. According to DC comics the book is in a perpetual "pre-production".

References

 
American companies established in 1993
2001 disestablishments in the United States
DC Comics imprints
Defunct comics and manga publishing companies